The 1855 Virginia gubernatorial election was held on May 24, 1855 to elect the governor of Virginia.

Results

References

1855
Virginia
gubernatorial
May 1855 events